Markio Tado is an Indian politician from the state of Arunachal Pradesh.

Tado was elected unopposed from the Tali seat in the 2014 Arunachal Pradesh Legislative Assembly election, standing as a People's Party of Arunachal candidate. He is an Engineer by qualification.

He won the 2014 elections on a People's Party of Arunachal ticket and switch to Indian National Congress

See also
Arunachal Pradesh Legislative Assembly

References

External links
 Markio Tado profile
 MyNeta Profile
 Markio Tado FB profile

People's Party of Arunachal politicians
Indian National Congress politicians
Living people
Arunachal Pradesh MLAs 2014–2019
Year of birth missing (living people)
Indian National Congress politicians from Arunachal Pradesh